Maroda is a village located in the Pauri Garhwal district of Uttarakhand, India.

Maroda is located 9 km ahead of Devprayag on the way to Sabdar Khal and Pauri. It is situated in the laps of the mountains of Uttarakhand and on the foothills of the Jai Danda Nagraja Mandir, a Hindu temple dedicated to the Krishna.

Maroda comes under the Pauri Garhwal district & Patti Kandwalsyun. The nearest hospitals, large markets, cinema halls and the government offices are all located in Pauri. Smaller markets can be found in the neighbouring areas like Devpryag, Sabdarkhal, and Sirala. Garhwali is the main dialect (language) spoken in the area.

Maroda is surrounded by the beautiful mountains & forest. The main water source is 1.5 km away from the village, which is called PANDHER, where fresh & crystal clear water comes out from mountains.
Bus Station for Maroda is around 5 km away from the village, which is called DHAUDA, it is a common bus stand for the nearby villages as well.

References 

Villages in Pauri Garhwal district